Human oocyte cryopreservation (egg freezing) is a procedure to preserve a woman's eggs (oocytes). This technique has been used to enable women to postpone pregnancy to a later date – whether for medical reasons (such as cancer treatment), or for social reasons (such as employment or studying). Several studies have shown that most infertility problems are due to germ cell deterioration related to aging. The intention of the procedure is that the woman may choose to have the eggs thawed, fertilized, and transferred to the uterus as embryos to facilitate a pregnancy in the future. The procedure's success rate (the chances of a live birth using frozen eggs) varies depending on the age of the woman, with odds being higher in younger, adult women.

Indications
Oocyte cryopreservation can increase the chance of a future pregnancy for three key groups of women: 
 those diagnosed with cancer who have not yet begun chemotherapy or radiotherapy; 
 those undergoing treatment with assisted reproductive technologies who do not consider embryo freezing an option; and
 those who would like to preserve their future ability to have children, either because they do not yet have a partner, or for other personal or medical reasons.
Over 50,000 reproductive-age women are diagnosed with cancer each year in the United States. Chemotherapy and radiotherapy are toxic for oocytes, leaving few, if any, viable eggs. Egg-freezing offers women with cancer the chance to preserve their eggs, so that they can attempt to have children in the future.

Oocyte cryopreservation is an option for individuals undergoing IVF who object, either for religious or ethical reasons, to the practice of freezing embryos. In this way, there are no excess embryos created, and there need not be any disposal of unused frozen embryos.

Additionally, women with a family history of early menopause may have an interest in fertility preservation as to preserve viable eggs that could deteriorate at an earlier onset.

Method
The egg retrieval process for oocyte cryopreservation is the same as that for in vitro fertilization. This includes one to several weeks of hormone injections that stimulate ovaries to ripen multiple eggs. When the eggs are mature, final maturation induction is performed, preferably by using a GnRH agonist rather than human chorionic gonadotrophin (hCG), since it decreases the risk of ovarian hyperstimulation syndrome with no evidence of a difference in live birth rate (in contrast to fresh cycles where usage of GnRH agonist has a lower live birth rate). The eggs are subsequently removed from the body by transvaginal oocyte retrieval. The procedure is usually conducted under sedation. The eggs are immediately frozen.

The egg is the largest cell in the human body and contains a large amount of water. When the egg is frozen, the ice crystals that form can destroy the integrity of the cell. To prevent this, the egg must be dehydrated prior to freezing. This is done using cryoprotectants which replace most of the water within the cell and inhibit the formation of ice crystals.

Eggs (oocytes) are frozen using either a controlled-rate, slow-cooling method or a newer flash-freezing process known as vitrification. Vitrification is much faster but requires higher concentrations of cryoprotectants to be added. The result of vitrification is a solid glass-like cell, free of ice crystals. Vitrification has been developed and successfully applied in IVF treatment with the first live birth following vitrification of oocytes achieved in 1999. Vitrification eliminates ice formation inside and outside of oocytes on cooling, during cryostorage and as the oocytes warm. Vitrification is associated with higher survival rates and enhanced development compared to slow-cooling when applied to oocytes in metaphase II (MII). Vitrification has also become the method of choice for pronuclear oocytes, although prospective randomized controlled trials are still lacking.

During the freezing process, the zona pellucida, or shell of the egg can be modified preventing fertilization. Thus, when eggs are thawed and pregnancy is desired, a fertilization procedure known as  ICSI  (Intracytoplasmic Sperm Injection) is performed by an embryologist whereby sperm is injected directly into the egg with a needle rather than allowing sperm to penetrate naturally by placing it around the egg in a dish.

Immature oocytes have been grown until maturation in vitro, but it is not yet clinically available.

Success rates
Early work investigating the percentage of transferred cycles showed lower frozen cycles compared with fresh cycles (approx. 30% and 50%), however more recent studies show "fertilization and pregnancy rates are similar to IVF/ICSI (or (in vitro fertilization/intracytoplasmic sperm injection) with fresh oocytes when [both when] vitrified and warmed oocytes are used as part of IVF/ICSI". These studies were completed mostly in young patients.

In a 2013 meta-analysis of more than 2,200 cycles using frozen eggs, scientists found the probability of having a live birth after three cycles was 31.5 percent for women who froze their eggs at age 25, 25.9 percent at age 30, 19.3 percent at age 35, and 14.8 percent at age 40.

Two 2000s studies showed that the rate of birth defects and chromosomal defects when using cryopreserved oocytes is consistent with that of natural conception.

Recent modifications in protocol regarding cryoprotectant composition, temperature and storage methods have had a large impact on the technology, and while it is still considered an experimental procedure, it is quickly becoming an option for women. Slow freezing traditionally has been the most commonly used method to cryopreserve oocytes, and is the method that has resulted in the most babies born from frozen oocytes worldwide. Ultra-rapid freezing or vitrification represents a potential alternative freezing method.

In the fall of 2009, The American Society for Reproductive Medicine (ASRM) issued an opinion on oocyte cryopreservation concluding that the science holds "great promise for applications in oocyte donation and fertility preservation" because recent laboratory modifications have resulted in improved oocyte survival, fertilization, and pregnancy rates from frozen-thawed oocytes in IVF. The ASRM noted that from the limited research performed to date, there does not appear to be an increase in chromosomal abnormalities, birth defects, or developmental deficits in the children born from cryopreserved oocytes. The ASRM recommended that, pending further research, oocyte cryopreservation should be introduced into clinical practice on an investigational basis and under the guidance of an Institutional Review Board (IRB). As with any new technology, safety and efficacy must be evaluated and demonstrated through continued research.

In October 2012, the ASRM lifted the experimental label from the technology for women with a medical need, citing success rates in live births, among other findings. However, they also warned against using it only to delay child-bearing.

In 2014, a Cochrane systematic review was published. It compared vitrification (the newest technology) versus slow freezing (the oldest one). Key results of that review showed that the clinical pregnancy rate was almost 4 times higher in the oocyte vitrification group than in the slow freezing group, with moderate quality of evidence.

Immature oocytes have been grown until maturation in vitro at a 10% survival rate, but no experiment has been performed to fertilize such oocytes.

Cost
The cost of the egg freezing procedure (without embryo transfer) in the United States, the United Kingdom and other European countries varies in between $5,000 and $12,000. This does not include the fertility medications involved in the procedure which can cost between $4,000 and $5,000. The cost of egg storage can vary from $100 to more than $1,000. Provisional health programs do not cover social egg freezing. Furthermore, no provinces provide funding for IVF after social egg freezing.

Medical tourism may have lower costs than performing egg freezing in high-cost countries like the US. Some well established medical tourism and IVF countries such as the Czech Republic, Ukraine and Cyprus offer egg freezing at competitive prices. It is a lower cost alternative to typical US options for egg freezing. Spain and the Czech Republic are popular destinations for this treatment.

History
Cryopreservation itself has always played a central role in assisted reproductive technology. With the first cryopreservation of sperm in 1953 and of embryos twenty five years later, these techniques have become routine. Dr. Christopher Chen of Singapore reported the world's first pregnancy in 1986 using previously frozen oocytes. This report stood alone for several years followed by studies reporting success rates using frozen eggs to be much lower than those of traditional in vitro fertilization (IVF) techniques using fresh oocytes. Providing the lead to a new direction in cryobiology, Dr. Lilia Kuleshova was the first scientist to achieve vitrification of human oocytes that resulted in a live birth in 1999. Articles published in the journal Fertility and Sterility reported that pregnancy rates using frozen oocytes that were comparable to those of cryopreserved embryos and even fresh embryos.

Elective oocyte cryopreservation
Elective oocyte cryopreservation, also known as social egg freezing, is non-essential egg freezing for the purpose of preserving fertility for delayed child-bearing when natural conception becomes more problematic. The frequency of this procedure has steadily increased since October 2012 when the American Society for Reproductive Medicine (ASRM) lifted the 'experimental' label from the process. There was a spike in interest in 2014 when global corporations Apple and Facebook revealed they were introducing egg freezing as a benefit for their female employees. This announcement was controversial as some women found it empowering and practical, while others viewed the message these companies were sending to women trying to have a successful long-term career and a family as harmful and alienating. A string of "egg freezing parties" hosted by third-party companies have also helped popularize the concept among young women.
Social science research suggests that women use elective egg freezing to disentangle their search for a romantic partner from their plans to have children.

In 2016, then US Secretary of Defense Ash Carter announced that the Department of Defense will cover the cost of freezing sperm or eggs through a pilot program for active duty service members, with the intention of preserving their ability to start a family even if they sustain certain combat injuries.

There are still warnings for women using this technology to fall pregnant at an older age as the risk of pregnancy complications increases with a mother's age. However, studies have shown that the risk of congenital abnormalities in babies born from frozen oocytes is not increased further when compared to naturally conceived babies.

Risks
The risks associated with egg freezing relate to the administration of medications to stimulate the ovaries and the procedure of egg collection.

The main risk associated with the administration of medications to stimulate the ovaries is ovarian hyper stimulation syndrome (OHSS). This is a transient syndrome in which there is increased permeability of the blood vessels, resulting in fluid loss from the vessels into the surrounding tissues. In most cases the syndrome is mild, with symptoms such as abdominal bloating, mild discomfort and nausea. In moderate OHSS there is increased abdominal bloating resulting in pain and vomiting. Reduced urine output may occur. Severe OHSS is serious with even further bloating so that the abdomen appears very distended, thirst and dehydration occur with minimal urine output. There may be shortness of breath and there is an increased risk of DVT and/or pulmonary embolism. Kidney and liver function can be compromised. Hospitalisation under specialist care is indicated. There is no treatment for OHSS, supportive care until the symptoms naturally resolve is required. If an hCG trigger has been used with no embryo transfer, OHSS usually resolves in 7–10 days. If an embryo transfer has occurred and pregnancy results, the symptoms may persist for several weeks. Doctors reduce the likelihood of OHSS occurring by decreasing the doses of gonadotropins (FSH) administered, using a GnRH agonist trigger (instead of an hCG trigger) and freezing all embryos for transfer rather than conducted a fresh embryo transfer.

Risks associated with the egg collection procedure relate to bleeding and infection. The collection procedure involves passing a needle through the wall of the vagina into vascular stimulated ovaries. A small amount of bleeding is inevitable. In rare cases, there is excessive bleeding into the abdomen requiring surgery. It is important that women undergoing the procedure advise their specialist of all medications, including herbal supplements, they are using so the specialist can assess whether any of these medications will affect the ability of the blood to clot. In relation to infection, provided the woman does not have additional risk factors for infection (suppressed immune system, use of immuno-suppressive medications or large ovarian endometriomas) the risk of infection is very low.

One additional risk of the ovaries being temporarily increased in size is ovarian torsion. Ovarian torsion occurs when an enlarged ovary twists around on itself, cutting off its blood supply. The condition is excruciatingly painful and requires urgent surgery to prevent the ischemic loss of the ovary.

See also
Egg donation
Semen cryopreservation
In vitro fertilization

References

External links
 How egg freezing works, Human Fertilisation and Embryology Authority
 National Cancer Institute – Sexuality and Reproductive Issues
 Mature oocyte cryopreservation: a guideline American Society for Reproductive Medicine (PDF)
 American Society for Reproductive Medicine
 World Association of Reproductive Medicine
 
 

Assisted reproductive technology
Cryopreservation